Kahn-e Mahalleh-ye Pain (also Romanized as Kahn-e Maḩalleh-ye Pā’īn) is a village in Rud Ab-e Sharqi Rural District, Rud Ab District, Narmashir County, Kerman Province, Iran. At the 2006 census, its population was 234, in 47 families.

References 

Populated places in Narmashir County